Cathode rays or electron beam (e-beam) are streams of electrons observed in discharge tubes. If an evacuated glass tube is equipped with two electrodes and a voltage is applied, glass behind the positive electrode is observed to glow, due to electrons emitted from the cathode (the electrode connected to the negative terminal of the voltage supply).  They were first observed in 1859 by German physicist Julius Plücker and Johann Wilhelm Hittorf, and were named in 1876 by Eugen Goldstein Kathodenstrahlen, or cathode rays. In 1897, British physicist J. J. Thomson showed that cathode rays were composed of a previously unknown negatively charged particle, which was later named the electron. Cathode-ray tubes (CRTs) use a focused beam of electrons deflected by electric or magnetic fields to render an image on a screen.

Description

Cathode rays are so named because they are emitted by the negative electrode, or cathode, in a vacuum tube. To release electrons into the tube, they first must be detached from the atoms of the cathode. In the early experimental cold cathode vacuum tubes in which cathode rays were discovered, called Crookes tubes, this was done by using a high electrical potential of thousands of volts between the anode and the cathode to ionize the residual gas atoms in the tube.  The positive ions were accelerated by the electric field toward the cathode, and when they collided with it they knocked electrons out of its surface; these were the cathode rays.   Modern vacuum tubes use thermionic emission, in which the cathode is made of a thin wire filament which is heated by a separate electric current passing through it. The increased random heat motion of the filament knocks electrons out of the surface of the filament, into the evacuated space of the tube.

Since the electrons have a negative charge, they are repelled by the negative cathode and attracted to the positive anode. They travel in parallel lines through the empty tube. The voltage applied between the electrodes accelerates these low mass particles to high velocities. Cathode rays are invisible, but their presence was first detected in these Crookes tubes when they struck the glass wall of the tube, exciting the atoms of the glass coating and causing them to emit light, a glow called fluorescence. Researchers noticed that objects placed in the tube in front of the cathode could cast a shadow on the glowing wall, and realized that something must be traveling in straight lines from the cathode. After the electrons strike the back of the tube they make their way to the anode, then travel through the anode wire through the power supply and back through the cathode wire to the cathode, so cathode rays carry electric current through the tube.

The current in a beam of cathode rays through a vacuum tube can be controlled by passing it through a metal screen of wires (a grid) between cathode and anode, to which a small negative voltage is applied. The electric field of the wires deflects some of the electrons, preventing them from reaching the anode. The amount of current that gets through to the anode depends on the voltage on the grid. Thus, a small voltage on the grid can be made to control a much larger voltage on the anode. This is the principle used in vacuum tubes to amplify electrical signals. The triode vacuum tube developed between 1907 and 1914 was the first electronic device that could amplify, and is still used in some applications such as radio transmitters. High speed beams of cathode rays can also be steered and manipulated by electric fields created by additional metal plates in the tube to which voltage is applied, or magnetic fields created by coils of wire (electromagnets). These are used in cathode-ray tubes, found in televisions and computer monitors, and in electron microscopes.

History
After the 1654 invention of the vacuum pump by Otto von Guericke, physicists began to experiment with passing high voltage electricity through rarefied air. In 1705, it was noted that electrostatic generator sparks travel a longer distance through low pressure air than through atmospheric pressure air.

Gas discharge tubes

In 1838, Michael Faraday applied a high voltage between two metal electrodes at either end of a glass tube that had been partially evacuated of air, and noticed a strange light arc with its beginning at the cathode (negative electrode) and its end at the anode (positive electrode). In 1857, German physicist and glassblower Heinrich Geissler sucked even more air out with an improved pump, to a pressure of around 10−3 atm and found that, instead of an arc, a glow filled the tube. The voltage applied between the two electrodes of the tubes, generated by an induction coil, was anywhere between a few kilovolts and 100 kV. These were called Geissler tubes, similar to today's neon signs.

The explanation of these effects was that the high voltage accelerated free electrons and electrically charged atoms (ions)  naturally present in the air of the tube. At low pressure, there was enough space between the gas atoms that the electrons could accelerate to high enough speeds that when they struck an atom they knocked electrons off of it, creating more positive ions and free electrons, which went on to create more ions and electrons in a chain reaction, known as a glow discharge.  The positive ions were attracted to the cathode and when they struck it knocked more electrons out of it, which were attracted toward the anode.  Thus the ionized air was electrically conductive and an electric current flowed through the tube.

Geissler tubes  had enough air in them that the electrons could only travel a tiny distance before colliding with an atom. The electrons in these tubes moved in a slow diffusion process, never gaining much speed, so these tubes didn't produce cathode rays. Instead, they produced a colorful glow discharge (as in a modern neon light), caused when the electrons struck gas atoms, exciting their orbital electrons to higher energy levels. The electrons released this energy as light. This process is called fluorescence.

Cathode rays

By the 1870s, British physicist William Crookes and others were able to evacuate tubes to a lower pressure, below 10−6 atm. These were called Crookes tubes. Faraday had been the first to notice a dark space just in front of the cathode, where there was no luminescence. This came to be called the "cathode dark space", "Faraday dark space" or "Crookes dark space". Crookes found that as he pumped more air out of the tubes, the Faraday dark space spread down the tube from the cathode toward the anode, until the tube was totally dark. But at the anode (positive) end of the tube, the glass of the tube itself began to glow.

What was happening was that as more air was pumped from the tube, the electrons knocked out of the cathode when positive ions struck it could travel farther, on average, before they struck a gas atom. By the time the tube was dark, most of the electrons could travel in straight lines from the cathode to the anode end of the tube without a collision. With no obstructions, these low mass particles were accelerated to high velocities by the voltage between the electrodes.  These were the cathode rays.

When they reached the anode end of the tube, they were traveling so fast that, although they were attracted to it, they often flew past the anode and struck the back wall of the tube. When they struck atoms in the glass wall, they excited their orbital electrons to higher energy levels.  When the electrons returned to their original energy level, they released the energy as light, causing the glass to fluoresce, usually a greenish or bluish color.  Later researchers painted the inside back wall with fluorescent chemicals such as zinc sulfide, to make the glow more visible.

Cathode rays themselves are invisible, but this accidental fluorescence allowed researchers to notice that objects in the tube in front of the cathode, such as the anode, cast sharp-edged shadows on the glowing back wall. In 1869, German physicist Johann Hittorf was first to realize that something must be traveling in straight lines from the cathode to cast the shadows. Eugen Goldstein named them cathode rays (German kathodenstrahlen).

Discovery of the electron
At this time, atoms were the smallest particles known, and were believed to be indivisible. What carried electric currents was a mystery. During the last quarter of the 19th century, many historic experiments were done with Crookes tubes to determine what cathode rays were. There were two theories. Crookes and Arthur Schuster believed they were particles of "radiant matter," that is, electrically charged atoms. German scientists Eilhard Wiedemann, Heinrich Hertz and Goldstein believed they were "aether waves", some new form of electromagnetic radiation, and were separate from what carried the electric current through the tube.

The debate was resolved in 1897 when J. J. Thomson measured the mass of cathode rays, showing they were made of particles, but were around 1800 times lighter than the lightest atom, hydrogen. Therefore, they were not atoms, but a new particle, the first subatomic particle to be discovered, which he originally called "corpuscle" but was later named electron, after particles postulated by George Johnstone Stoney in 1874. He also showed they were identical with particles given off by photoelectric and radioactive materials. It was quickly recognized that they are the particles that carry electric currents in metal wires, and carry the negative electric charge of the atom.

Thomson was given the 1906 Nobel Prize in Physics for this work. Philipp Lenard also contributed a great deal to cathode-ray theory, winning the Nobel Prize in 1905 for his research on cathode rays and their properties.

Vacuum tubes
The gas ionization (or cold cathode) method of producing cathode rays used in Crookes tubes was unreliable, because it depended on the pressure of the residual air in the tube. Over time, the air was absorbed by the walls of the tube, and it stopped working.

A more reliable and controllable method of producing cathode rays was investigated by Hittorf and Goldstein, and rediscovered by Thomas Edison in 1880. A cathode made of a wire filament heated red hot by a separate current passing through it would release electrons into the tube by a process called thermionic emission. The first true electronic vacuum tubes, invented in 1904 by John Ambrose Fleming, used this hot cathode technique, and they superseded Crookes tubes. These tubes didn't need gas in them to work, so they were evacuated to a lower pressure, around 10−9 atm (10−4 Pa). The ionization method of creating cathode rays used in Crookes tubes is today only used in a few specialized gas discharge tubes such as krytrons.

In 1906, Lee De Forest found that a small voltage on a grid of metal wires between the cathode and anode could control a current in a beam of cathode rays passing through a vacuum tube. His invention, called the triode, was the first device that could amplify electric signals, and revolutionized electrical technology, creating the new field of electronics. Vacuum tubes made radio and television broadcasting possible, as well as radar, talking movies, audio recording, and long distance telephone service, and were the foundation of consumer electronic devices until the 1960s, when the transistor brought the era of vacuum tubes to a close.

Cathode rays are now usually called electron beams. The technology of manipulating electron beams pioneered in these early tubes was applied practically in the design of vacuum tubes, particularly in the invention of the cathode-ray tube (CRT) by Ferdinand Braun in 1897, which was used in television sets and oscilloscopes.  Today, electron beams are employed in sophisticated devices such as electron microscopes, electron beam lithography and particle accelerators.

Properties
Like a wave, cathode rays travel in straight lines, and produce a shadow when obstructed by objects. Ernest Rutherford demonstrated that rays could pass through thin metal foils, behavior expected of a particle. These conflicting properties caused disruptions when trying to classify it as a wave or particle. Crookes insisted it was a particle, while Hertz maintained it was a wave. The debate was resolved when an electric field was used to deflect the rays by J. J. Thomson. This was evidence that the beams were composed of particles  because scientists knew it was impossible to deflect electromagnetic waves with an electric field. These can also create mechanical effects, fluorescence, etc.

Louis de Broglie later (1924) showed in his doctoral dissertation that electrons are in fact much like photons in the respect that they act both as waves and as particles in a dual manner as Albert Einstein had shown earlier for light. The wave-like behaviour of cathode rays was later directly demonstrated using a crystal lattice by Davisson and Germer in 1927.

See also

β (beta) particles
Electron beam processing
Electron diffraction
Electron microscope
Electron beam melting
Electron beam welding
Electron beam technology
Electron gun
Electron irradiation
Ionizing radiation
Particle accelerator
Sterilisation (microbiology)

References

 General Chemistry (structure and properties of matter) by Aruna Bandara (2010)

External links
The Cathode Ray Tube site
Crookes tube with maltese cross operating
The simulation show electrons in crossed fields made by BIGS

Electromagnetism
Electron beam
Articles containing video clips